Boise Centre is Idaho's largest convention center. It is located in downtown Boise. The centre offers 50,000 square feet of flexible meeting and event space, and is currently expanding to add 36,000 additional square feet of space. Upon completion, it will be able to accommodate groups from 10 to 2,000. The expansion was scheduled for use from September 2016.

Boise Centre is an operating entity of the Greater Boise Auditorium District.

External links
 Official website
 Greater Boise Auditorium District Website

Convention centers in Idaho
Buildings and structures in Boise, Idaho
Tourist attractions in Boise, Idaho
1990 establishments in Idaho